Season 4: The Showstoppers contains one cover song from each of the top 12 finalists during season 4 of the television show American Idol, along with a song that features all 12 of them together.

The CD was certified gold on July 26, 2005.

 "Independence Day" (Martina McBride) – 3:22 Carrie Underwood 
 "I Don't Wanna Be" (Gavin DeGraw) – 3:40 Bo Bice
 "Best of My Love" (The Emotions) – 3:31 Vonzell Solomon 
 "A House Is Not A Home" (Luther Vandross) – 3:18 Anwar Robinson 
 "You Don't Have to Say You Love Me" (Dusty Springfield) – 2:54 Nadia Turner 
 "Part-Time Lover" (Stevie Wonder) – 3:44 Nikko Smith 
 "My Funny Valentine" (from Babes in Arms) – 3:16 Constantine Maroulis
 "Total Eclipse of the Heart" (Bonnie Tyler) – 4:33 Jessica Sierra
 "Every Time You Go Away" (Paul Young) – 3:53 Anthony Fedorov 
 "Against All Odds (Take a Look at Me Now)" (Phil Collins) – 3:21 Scott Savol 
 "Knock On Wood" (Eddie Floyd) – 2:52 Lindsey Cardinale 
 "God Bless the Child" (Billie Holiday) – 3:32 Mikalah Gordon
 "When You Tell Me That You Love Me" (Diana Ross) – 3:44 American Idol Season 4 Finalists

References

American Idol compilation series
2005 soundtrack albums
2005 compilation albums